The men's 10,000 meter at the 2015 KNSB Dutch Single Distance Championships took place in Heerenveen at the Thialf ice skating rink on Sunday 2 November 2014. There were 14 participants.

Statistics

Result

Source:

Referee: Jan Bolt. Starter: Janny Smegen 
Start: 15:09 hr. Finish: 17:47 hr.

Draw

References

Single Distance Championships
2015 Single Distance